Mariana Yankulova  (born 23 August 1969) is a Bulgarian rower. She competed in the women's coxless four event at the 1992 Summer Olympics.

References

External links
 

1969 births
Living people
Bulgarian female rowers
Olympic rowers of Bulgaria
Rowers at the 1992 Summer Olympics
People from Velingrad